Colonel Shuffle is a fictional character in the Looney Tunes stable, based in the Southern United States.

History
He has been shown as fiercely loyal to this region and deeply offended by anything that he feels reminds him of the Northern United States.

He referred to himself specifically by name in Mississippi Hare (1949), following a game of poker in which he lost (three queens to four kings) and proceeded to let off a barrage of gunfire. Sometimes, he is shown playing a banjo in classic Dixieland style.

In Dog Gone South (1950), Colonel Shuffle had an encounter with Charlie Dog (whom he defeated).

Later appearances
A Colonel Shuffle-lookalike appears in the Tiny Toon Adventures episode "Gang Busters" voiced by Joe Alaskey. He appears as the prison warden of the prison in which Bugs Bunny and Daffy Duck are incarcerated.

References

Animated human characters
Looney Tunes characters
Film characters introduced in 1949